Ernest "Pot" Graves (March 27, 1880 – June 9, 1953) was an American football and baseball player, coach, and United States Army officer.  He served as the head football coach at the United States Military Academy in 1906 and 1912.  Graves retired from the Army with the rank of brigadier general.

Biography
Graves was born and raised in Chapel Hill, North Carolina.  He attended the United States Military Academy at West Point, New York, graduating second in his class in 1905.

He served with the 3rd Engineers at Fort Leavenworth, Kansas, and subsequently served in the Philippines from 1909 to 1910.  He later served in Mexico with General John J. Pershing, commanding the engineering company that built roads to allow supplies to be provided to the Army.  He also served with Pershing in France during World War I.  During World War I, he was placed in charge of the Intermediate Section and was responsible for building warehouses used to supply the Army in France.  He was retired from the Army in 1921 due to deafness.

Family and death
After leaving the military, Graves married Lucie Gunn Birnie in 1923.  Graves' son, Ernest Graves Jr., became a lieutenant general in the Army.  Graves died at the age of 73 on June 9, 1953 at Walter Reed Hospital in Washington, D.C.

Head coaching record

Football

See also
 List of college football head coaches with non-consecutive tenure

Notes

References

1880 births
1953 deaths
American football fullbacks
Baseball catchers
Army Black Knights baseball players
Army Black Knights football coaches
Army Black Knights football players
Harvard Crimson football coaches
North Carolina Tar Heels baseball coaches
North Carolina Tar Heels football players
United States Army personnel of World War I
United States Army generals
People from Chapel Hill, North Carolina
Military personnel from North Carolina
Baseball players from North Carolina
Players of American football from North Carolina